René Charles Joseph Marie Lefebvre (23 February 1879 – 4 March 1944) was a French factory-owner from Tourcoing, who died in the  German concentration camp in Sonnenburg,  in the Province of Brandenburg (today in Lubusz Province in western Poland), where he had been imprisoned by the German Gestapo because of his work for the French Resistance and British Intelligence. René Lefebvre was the father of French Roman Catholic archbishop Marcel Lefebvre, the founder of the international Traditionalist Catholic organisation Priestly Fraternity of Saint Pius X (SSPX).

Life
Lefebvre was born in Tourcoing in Nord, in northern France in 1879, from a family which gave almost fifty of its members to the Church since 1738, including a cardinal, a few bishops and many priests and religious He was a devout Catholic who brought his children to daily Mass. In 1923, he advised two of his sons, Marcel and René, to begin studies for the priesthood at the French Seminary in Rome. Of his eight children, two became missionary Priests, three girls entered in different religious congregations and the other three founded large Catholic families.

Lefebvre was also an outspoken monarchist who ran a spy-ring for British Intelligence when Tourcoing was occupied by the Imperial German Army during World War I.

Later, during World War II, when Nazi Germany occupied France, he resumed this work, smuggling soldiers and escaped prisoners to un-occupied France and London. He was arrested and sentenced to death in Berlin on 28 May 1942 for "complicity with the enemy and recruitment of young people to bear arms against the Greater German Reich". He was sent to KZ Sonnenburg, a former prison converted into a concentration camp, mainly holding Communist and Social Democrat activists. Lefebvre died in Sonnenburg after one year of sufferings and privations; his body has never been recovered.

Legacy
On 16 July 1953, Lefebvre was posthumously decorated by the Government of the  Fourth French Republic with the Médaille militaire for his active participation in the French Resistance. Lefebvre was married to Gabrielle Watine, who died in 1938.

References

French Resistance members
French monarchists
People who died in Sonnenburg concentration camp
People from Tourcoing
French Roman Catholics
World War I spies for the United Kingdom
World War II spies for the United Kingdom
1879 births
1944 deaths
French industrialists
French civilians killed in World War II